Estratos de San Pedro is the name given to the sedimentary strata of Paleogene age that crop out along San Pedro River, southern Chile.
The strata are made up of conglomerate, sandstone and mudstone (Chilean Spanish: fangolita). The clasts of the conglomerates are made up of metamorphic rock and the disposition of the conglomerates varies from clast-supported to matrix-supported. The sandstone and mudstone contains layers of lignite coal that exceed  in thickness.

References 

Geologic formations of Chile
Miocene Series of South America
Oligocene Series of South America
Eocene Series of South America
Paleogene Chile
Neogene Chile
Sandstone formations
Geology of Los Ríos Region